Euryprosopus clavipes is a species of beetle in the family Cerambycidae, the only species in the genus Euryprosopus.

References

Xystrocerini
Monotypic Cerambycidae genera